Association Sportive de la DGSSIE is a football (soccer) club from Chad based in N'Djamena. DGSSIE refers to Direction Générale des Services de Sécurité et des Institutions de l'Etat.

Achievements
Chad Premier League: 0
Chad Cup: 0
Coupe de Ligue de N'Djaména: 0
Chad Super Cup: 0

Performance in CAF competitions

External links
Ligue match report

Football clubs in Chad
N'Djamena
Police association football clubs